Wilson Island is the name of several different Islands.

Antarctica
 Wilson Island (Antarctica)

Australia
 Wilson Island (Shark Bay), an island in Western Australia
 Wilson Island (Queensland), an island on the Great Barrier Reef 

Bermuda
 Wilson Island, Bermuda

Canada
 Wilson Island (Lake Superior), an island in Lake Superior near Rossport, Ontario owned by the Nature Conservancy of Canada
 Wilson Island (North West Territories), an island in the North West Territories  
 Wilson Island (Saskatchewan), an island on the South Saskatchewan River

India
 Wilson Island (Ritchie's Archipelago), an island in the Andaman Sea

United States
 Wilson Island (West Virginia), an island on the Kanawha River in Charleston